The Right Thing is a 1963 comedy Australian television play. Australian TV drama was relatively rare at the time.

Plot
The adventures of a Sydney family. Clarrie and Vera Hamlin are holding an engagement party for their eldest daughter Elena when a handsome young Spanish man, J.G., comes into an encounter with them.

Cast
Lola Brooks as Elena 		
Brigid Lenihan as Vera Hamlin
Alastair Smart as JG		
Grant Taylor as Clarrie Hamlin
David Yorston

Production
The play was written by Raymond Bowers, an Australian living in London. It was mapped out at a lunch early in 1963 between Bowers and director Ray Menmuir in London and was commissioned by Associated Rediffusion. It was directed by Memnuir who had recently returned to Australia after several years in London. It was hoped the play would be the first in a number of co productions between England and Australia.

Scenes were shot in a house on Sydney's North Shore, the Cahill Expressway, the Sydney beach of Longreef, and the Harbour Bridge. It was telerecorded and later shown in London by Associated-Rediffusion. It was the first of a series of exchange programs between the ABC and the British television company.

Alister Smart had also recently returned to England.

Reception
Rod Serling saw the play and disliked the script but praised the acting.

The TV critic from the Sydney Morning Herald said "there was polish in the filming and the script" of The Right Thing but "the fun is wearing a little thin... The insistence on heavily accented Australiana may be more acceptable to overseas audiences than home viewers but the comedy was very well handled."

The Sunday Sydney Morning Herald called it "one of the biggest turkeys the ABC has given us this season... a dreary and slow moving 90 minutes... almost redeemed by the first class acting of its stars."

The Bulletin wrote that in the play "Australians are pre-1939 characters   who drive   1963   cars and live in contemporary homes. The males are Flintstones; publicans and   beach boys in   conflict   with a kind of supple European   valor   which  baffles them, though   the   girls   understand   it   well enough....

See also
List of television plays broadcast on Australian Broadcasting Corporation (1960s)

References

External links
The Right Thing at IMDb

1960s Australian television plays
1963 television plays